This is a list of notable Cajun musicians, Cajun music instrument makers, Cajun music folklorists, Cajun music historians, and Cajun music activists.

List of Cajun musicians
This is a list of musicians who perform or performed Cajun music. The musicians are not necessarily Cajuns, nor necessarily limited to Louisiana musicians.

Traditional Cajun

 Amédé Ardoin, accordion 
 Bois Sec Ardoin
 Breaux Brothers, accordion, fiddle, guitar trio 
 Cléoma Breaux, guitar 
 Sady Courville, fiddle
 Joe Falcon, accordion 
 Canray Fontenot, fiddle
 Wade Fruge, fiddle
 Blind Uncle Gaspard
 Mayeus Lafleur
 Dennis McGee, fiddle 
 Segura Brothers
 Leo Soileau

Country/Texas swing Cajun
 Hadley J. Castille, fiddle
 Harry Choates, fiddle
 Varise Conner
 Luderin Darbone
 Edwin Duhon
 J. B. Fuselier
 Hackberry Ramblers
 Leroy "Happy Fats" Leblanc

Dancehall Cajun
 Nathan Abshire and the Pinegrove Boys
 Cleveland Crochet
 Camey Doucet
 Iry LeJeune
 Phil Menard
 Austin Pitre
 Belton Richard, accordion
 Aldus Roger and the Lafayette Playboys
 Lawrence Walker and the Wandering Aces

Cajun "renaissance"
 Balfa Brothers, fiddlers and guitarists
 Dewey Balfa, fiddle
 BeauSoleil
 Charivari
 Octa Clark
 Michael Doucet, fiddle
 Harrison Fontenot
 Alan LaFleur, upright bass
 The Lost Bayou Ramblers
 D.L. Menard
 Pine Leaf Boys
 The Red Stick Ramblers
 The Revelers
 Zachary Richard, accordion
 Ann Savoy, guitarist, singer, author
 Joel Savoy, fiddler, music producer
 Marc Savoy, accordion
 Wilson Savoy, accordion
 Steve Riley and the Mamou Playboys
 Feufollet

Contemporary Cajun music
 Barry Jean Ancelet
Christine Balfa
 Lee Benoit
 Hunter Hayes
 Kevin Naquin
 Steve Riley and the Mamou Playboys
 Wayne Toups and his legendary roadie Johnny Opelousas

Other Cajun musicians/groups

Solo artists

 Al Berard
 Octa Clark
 Camey Doucet
 L. J. Foret
 J. B. Fuselier
 Blind Uncle Gaspard
 David Greely
 Hunter Hayes
 Doc Guidry
 Doug Kershaw
 Rusty Kershaw
 Mayeus Lafleur
 Sonny Landreth
 Iry LeJeune
 D.L. Menard
 Jimmy C. Newman
 Austin Pitre
 Crystal Plamondon
 Belton Richard, accordion
 Zachary Richard, accordion
 Ann Savoy
 Joel Savoy
 Wilson Savoy
 Amanda Shaw
 Leo Soileau
 Jo-El Sonnier, vocals
 Lawrence Walker
 Kevin Wimmer

Bands
 Nathan Abshire and the Pinegrove Boys
 Balfa Brothers
 Breaux Brothers
 Captain Gumbo (a Netherlands band)
 Hackberry Ramblers
 Red Stick Ramblers
 Belton Richard and the Musical Aces
 The Sundown Playboys
 Lisa Haley and the Zydekats

Other Cajun musicians playing non-Cajun music
 Johnnie Allan, swamp pop musician
 Rod Bernard, swamp pop musician
 John Fred, swamp pop & rock and roll musician
 Sammy Kershaw, country music artist
 Warren Storm, swamp pop musician
 Rufus Thibodeaux, Cajun and country music artist (fiddler)

Other related Cajun music producers, authors, folklorists, historians, and activists
 Barry Ancelet, folklorist, cultural activist
 Ryan Brasseaux, cultural historian
 Carl A. Brasseaux, historian
 Kevin Fontenot, historian
 Richard Guidry, cultural activist
 Harry Oster, LSU folklorist, recorded in the 1950s
 Ann Savoy, guitarist, singer, author, and record producer

List of Cajun instrument makers
 Andre Michot, accordion builder
 Larry Miller, accordion builder
 Marc Savoy, accordion builder and player, cultural activist

See also
 List of Cajuns
 Cajun French Music Association
 History of Cajun music

References

 Ancelet, Barry. Cajun Music. Journal of American Folklore 107 (1994): 285-303
 www.cajunfrenchmusic.org/music/halloffame.htm
 Yule, Ron, Cajun French Music Association Hall of Fame, Lake Charles Chapter, DeRidder, LA: Fiddle Country Publishing, 2004.
 Yule, Ron, Iry LeJeune: Wailing the Blues Cajun Style, Natchitoches, LA: Northwestern State University of Louisiana Press, 2007.
 http://www.zydecocajun.com/

Isom Fontenot Harmonica/Other instruments

 
Cajun
Musicians from Louisiana